"Diras que estoy loco" is a 2006 song recorded by Spanish singer and actor Miguel Ángel Muñoz. It was the lead single from his album M.A.M. and was released first in 2004 in Spain, then in June 2006 in other countries. The song was originally performed by the character he performed, Roberto Arenales, in the television series Un Paso Adelante. In 2004, the song was ranked No. 1 in Spain for eleven consecutive weeks, with over 180,000 units sold. It was released two years later and achieved success in Italy, reaching #2 on the charts, and France, where it peaked at #3. The 2006 release was supported by a new version of the music video.

Track listings
 CD single

 Digital download

Credits

 General
 Lyrics and music : J. Léon and J.C. Ortega
 Artistic direction : Miguel Angel Muñoz
 Photo : Bernardo Doral
 Assistant photo : Alberto Gallego
 Artwork : Crazybaby!
 Producer : Hitvisión

 "Vivo para ti"
 Lyrics and music : Marc Martin
 Guitar : Jean-Paul Depeyron
 Arranger :  M. Martin and Santi Maspons
 Producer : Francesc Pellicer

Release history

Charts

1 The Spanish Singles Chart archives provide by Spanishcharts are not available before 2005.

Certifications and sales

References

2004 singles
2006 singles
2007 singles
Miguel Ángel Muñoz songs
Number-one singles in Spain
2004 songs
Blanco y Negro Records singles